The Golden Rivers Football Netball League (GRFNL) is an Australian rules football and netball organisation with clubs in north central Victoria and the western Riverina district of New South Wales.

The League formed in 1919 and was known as the Kerang and District Football Association until 1944.  In 1946 the league was reestablished as the Kerang and District Football League.  In 1998 the League changed its name to the Golden Rivers Football League at the direction of the Victorian Country Football League, to better reflect its expansion beyond the immediate Kerang area.

Statistics

Clubs
The League currently has teams from six towns in Victoria and New South Wales.  All football clubs field seniors, reserves, under 17's and under 14's teams. All netball clubs field an A grade, B grade, B reserve, 17 and under and 14 and under grades.

Current

Former

Premiers

1945 QUAMBATOOK 
1946 KERANG 
1947 MACORNA 
1948 MACORNA 
1949 MURRABIT 
1950 BOORT 
1951 MACORNA 
1952 MACORNA 
1953 MACORNA 
1954 KERANG ROVERS 
1955 WANDELLA 
1956 WANDELLA 
1957 WANDELLA 
1958 MURRABIT 
1959 WANDELLA 
1960 MACORNA 
1961 MOULAMEIN 
1962 MACORNA 
1963 MURRABIT 
1964 APPIN 
1965 MURRABIT 
1966 MURRABIT 
1967 MURRABIT 
1968 MURRABIT 
1969 MURRABIT 
1970 MACORNA 
1971 KERANG ROVERS 
1972 LAKES 
1973 QUAMBATOOK 
1974 QUAMBATOOK 
1975 KERANG ROVERS 
1976 WAKOOL 
1977 WANDELLA 
1978 WAKOOL 
1979 WANDELLA 
1980 WAKOOL 
1981 ULTIMA 
1982 HAY 
1983 ULTIMA 
1984 QUAMBATOOK 
1985 WANDELLA 
1986 WANDELLA 
1987 APPIN 
1988 MOULAMEIN 
1989 WAKOOL 
1990 WAKOOL 
1991 ULTIMA 
1992 HAY 
1993 WANDELLA 
1994 ULTIMA 
1995 HAY 
1996 ULTIMA 
1997 QUAMBATOOK 
1998 NULLAWIL 
1999 MURRABIT 
2000 NULLAWIL 
2001 NULLAWIL 
2002 ULTIMA 
2003 ULTIMA 
2004 ULTIMA 
2005 MURRABIT 
2006 WAKOOL 
2007 MURRABIT 
2008 WANDELLA 
2009 WANDELLA
2010 WANDELLA
2011 WANDELLA
2012 NULLAWIL
2013 WAKOOL
2014 ULTIMA
2015 ULTIMA
2016 MURRABIT
2017 WANDELLA
2018 NULLAWIL
2019 NULLAWIL
2020 League in recess due to COVID-19 pandemic 
2021 Finals not played due to COVID-19 pandemic 
2022 NULLAWIL

Leading Goal Kickers

2013 Ladder

2014 Ladder

2015 Ladder

2016 Ladder

2017 Ladder

2018 Ladder

See Also 

 Group 20 Rugby League

References

External links
 

1919 establishments in Australia
Sports leagues established in 1919
Australian rules football competitions in New South Wales
Australian rules football competitions in Victoria (Australia)